Shirak Poghosyan (born 24 September 1969 in Yerevan, Armenian SSR) is an Armenian long jumper. He competed at the 2000 Summer Olympics in the men's long jump. Poghosyan's best jump is 8.08 meters, achieved in 2000.

References

External links
 Sports-Reference.com

1969 births
Living people
Sportspeople from Yerevan
Armenian male long jumpers
Olympic athletes of Armenia
Athletes (track and field) at the 2000 Summer Olympics